Free Hill (also called Free Hills) is an unincorporated community in Clay County, Tennessee, United States. It is an African American community established in 1816, before the Civil War.

The original inhabitants were the freed slaves of Virginia Hill, the daughter of a wealthy North Carolina planter. After purchasing  of isolated hilly land, Hill freed her slaves and turned the property over to them. Folklore suggests that the original residents included Virginia Hill's own mulatto children.

At its peak, the community had about 300 residents and included two grocery stores, three clubs, two eating establishments, two churches, and a school.  Today, Free Hill's population is approximately 70.

Free Hills Rosenwald School
The settlement's Rosenwald school was one of 354 schools for African Americans built in the early 20th century with financial support from the Julius Rosenwald Fund. The Free Hills Rosenwald School was used from approximately 1925 to 1949. The structure, which is believed to be one of only about 30 Rosenwald schools still standing, was placed on the National Register of Historic Places in 1996.

Recent years
A small number of residents remain in Free Hill, whose population has declined since the 1960s. In September 1993 the state of Tennessee placed a historical marker on Tennessee State Route 53 to identify the community and commemorate its history.

References

External links
 The Free Hills Community, an African-American heritage area
 Documentary video about the Rosenwald School

African-American history of Tennessee
Unincorporated communities in Clay County, Tennessee
Rosenwald schools in Tennessee
Unincorporated communities in Tennessee
Clay County, Tennessee
Populated places established by African Americans